Prajakta Shukre (born 29 November 1987) is an Indian singer who works in Bollywood films and has appeared on reality shows.

Career
From the age of four, she started participating in singing competitions. While she was in 12th standard, she decided to participate on season 1 of the singing-based reality television show Indian Idol. She rose to prominence after becoming the only female contestant to reach top five in her season. She finished fourth in her season.

After the show ended, she received various offers to sing professionally. She was signed by the Sony BMG label, and with composer Leslie Lewis, she released her debut solo album. She has performed on various stage shows with the winner of Indian Idol season 1, Abhijeet Sawant.

Discography
Dhakka (2007) – Ithun Dhakka, Kuch To Kaho, Rangeela Re, Chori se, Gajab Hua, Kya Haal Hain, Neend Churayi Meri
Hey Ganapati (2005)
Shaadi No. 1 (2005) – Hello Madam
Jaan-E-Mann (2006) – Kabul Kar Le
Kehna Hai Aaj (2009)
Tees Maar Khan (2010) – Happy Ending
Jana Gana Bhaj Mana (2011)
Apni Azadi Ko Hum (2012)
Lagi Sai Lagan (2013)
Jigariyaa (2014) – Mora Rangddar Saiyyaan
Man Kyu Behka (The Unwind Mix) (2014)
Jaane Kya Baat Hai (The Unwind Mix) (2014)
Pucho Na Yaar Kya Hua (The Unwind Mix) (2015)
Jai Ganesh Deva Aarti (2015)
Aarti Kije Shri Raghuvarji Ki (Ram Aarti) (2015)
Bhor Bhayi Din Chadh Gaya (2015)
Om Jai Jagdish Hare Aarti (2015)
Fusion Shiva – Om Jai Shiv Omkara (2016)
Ye Zameen Ga Rahi Hai I (The Unwind Mix) (2016)
Ka Karoon Sajni I (The Classical Unwind Mix) (2016) 
Kya Yahi Pyaar Hai (Bollywood Retro Lounge) (2016)
FU: Friendship Unlimited (2017) – Uff Tuza Ha Jalwa
Tu Rutha To (Bollywood Retro Love) (2017)
Premam Jayati (2018)
Tum Saath Ho Jab Apne (The Unwind Mix) (2018)
Agar Tum Na Hote (Unwind Version) (2018)
Chingariyan Yeh Dheemi Si (2018)
Manikarnika: The Queen of Jhansi (2019) – Dankila song
Thalaivii (2021) - Teri Aankhon Mein

References

External links
 
 

1977 births
Living people
Indian women playback singers
Indian Idol participants
Indian women pop singers
21st-century Indian singers
Bollywood playback singers
21st-century Indian women singers